The Bentheim Black Pied, also known as  Schwarz-Wesses or Buntes Bentheimer Schwein, is a rare breed of domestic pig in Germany.

The breed originated in Bentheim, Germany, in the early 20th century, when local breeds were crossed with Berkshire and Cornwalls. It became nearly extinct in the 1950s, and is now a "rare breed". with about 100 registered breeding animals.

Description
Pigs are medium-sized, lop-eared, and colored white with black spots. Boars average 75 cm height, 250 kg weight; sows average 70 cm height, 180 kg weight.

Notes

References 
 Oklahoma State University
 School of Veterinary Medicine Hannover

Pig breeds originating in Germany
Animal breeds on the GEH Red List